Alvignac is a commune in the Lot department in southwestern France.

Population
Inhabitants are called Alvignacois.

See also 
 Communes of the Lot department
 Cave of Reveillon

References

Communes of Lot (department)